Livonian is a Finnic language, and, as such, is closely related to both Estonian and Finnish.

Tones 
Livonian is a pitch accent language, it has a rising tone that can appear in words, it is marked with a '.

Pronouns

Personal Pronouns

Note: the third person pronouns do not possess a gender in the singular or the plural.

Demonstrative Pronouns

Note:  The plural demonstrative pronoun is the same as the third person plural personal pronoun.

Reflexive Pronouns

Note:  The usage of the reflexive pronoun is broad.  Of course, it is used as a reflexive pronoun as in "minnõn eņtšõn um vajag...," meaning "I need..." [lit: to myself is necessary...]. However, the pronoun can also express possession; it frequently replaces the genitive forms of the personal pronouns.  For example:  "ma sīeda kūliz eņtš izast", or "I heard it from my father."  Also, reflexive pronouns can be used in adverbial expressions: "täm eņtš ie", "this same night".

Cases 

The following are the cases in Livonian:

Examples

Moods 
The following are the moods in Livonian:

References

Bibliography

 

grammar
Finnic grammars
Finnic languages
Languages of Latvia